Aquatica may refer to:
 Aquatica (water parks), a chain of water parks in the United States
 Aquatica Orlando
 Aquatica San Antonio
 Aquatica San Diego
 Aquatica (Kolkata), a water park in Kolkata
 Aquatica KK, an aquarium in Kota Kinabalu, Malaysia, also known as The Green Connection
 Aquatica (beetle), a genus of fireflies

See also
 Psathyrella aquatica, a species of mushroom
 Pachira aquatica, a tropical wetland tree